Nicole Oyeyemisi Payne (born 18 January 2001) is an American-born Nigerian footballer who plays as a forward and a defender for collegiate team West Virginia Mountaineers and the Nigeria women's national team.

Early life
Payne was raised in Birmingham, Alabama.

College career
Payne has attended the Oak Mountain High School in her hometown and the West Virginia University in Morgantown, West Virginia.

International career
Payne made her senior debut for Nigeria on 10 June 2021 as a 90th-minute substitution in a 0–1 friendly loss to Jamaica.

Personal life
Payne is the younger sister of fellow footballers Toni Payne and Stephen Payne. She and her sister Toni have played together in the Nigeria women's national team.

References

External links 

2001 births
Living people
Citizens of Nigeria through descent
Nigerian women's footballers
Women's association football forwards
Women's association football defenders
Nigeria women's international footballers
Soccer players from Birmingham, Alabama
American women's soccer players
West Virginia Mountaineers women's soccer players
American sportspeople of Nigerian descent
African-American women's soccer players
21st-century African-American sportspeople
21st-century African-American women